József Tóth (Békés, June 22, 1933) is a hydrogeologist and Professor Emeritus of the University of Alberta in Canada and Honorary Professor at the Eötvös Loránd University in Budapest, Hungary.

Biography
József Tóth was born in Békés, Hungary in 1933. In 1952 he was admitted to the University of Sopron as a student of geophysics. He took part in the Hungarian Revolution of 1956, after the fall of which he fled to Austria and then the Netherlands. He resumed his studies at Utrecht University, and in 1960 emigrated to the Canadian province of Alberta with his wife and two children. In 1965 he received his doctorate in Utrecht.

Career

Although he was employed as a geophysicist at the Research Council of Alberta, he soon had to work as a groundwater consultant in Hydrogeology. Working from M.K. Hubbert's 1940 paper "The theory of ground-water motion"  Tóth solved the Laplace equation for a "unit basin" geometry. Superposing a sinusoidal constant head surface on the unit basin "resulted in the concept of composite flow patterns.", referred to as "hierarchically nested flow systems." His theory of regional groundwater flow is discussed in most hydrogeology textbooks, such as Fetter, Hornberger et al., Deming, and Freeze and Cherry's Groundwater, the cover of which prominently featured his regional flow diagram. He rose to be the Head of the Groundwater Department at the Research Council. He also taught hydrogeology courses at the University of Alberta and University of Calgary and was a full professor at the University of Alberta (Rostron, Benjamin J, p. 205-206 in Deming, 2002.

Among his more than a hundred publications of international influence based on his theory, several of his studies cover special fields, such as: underground storage of highly radioactive waste; formation and improvement of saline soils; hydrocarbon and uranium ore exploration; soil and rock mechanics; and formation of wetlands.

Awards, recognitions 
 Meinzer Award - Hydrogeology Division of the Geological Society of America (1965)
 President's Award - International Association of Hydrogeologists (1999) 
 M. King Hubbert Science Award - National Groundwater Association (2003) 
 Theis Award - American Institute of Hydrology (2004)
 Magyar Érdemrend középkereszt polgári tagozata állami kitüntetés (2013)
 External Member Hungarian Academy of Sciences (2016)

Significant works 

Tóth József publication list, Tóth József és Erzsébet Hidrogeológia Professzúra honlapján a Virtuális könyvtárban
Tóth József publication list

References

1933 births
Living people
Hydrogeologists
20th-century Canadian scientists
Canadian geologists
21st-century Canadian scientists